

Acts of the National Assembly for Wales

|-
| {{|Food Hygiene Rating (Wales) Act 2013|cyshort=Deddf Sgorio Hylendid Bwyd (Cymru) 2013|anaw|2|04-03-2013|maintained=y|url=deddf-sgorio-hylendid-bwyd-cymru-food-hygiene-rating-wales-act|An Act of the National Assembly for Wales to make provision for the production of food hygiene ratings of food business establishments; the display of information about food hygiene ratings; the enforcement of requirements to display information; and for connected purposes.|cylong=Deddf gan Gynulliad Cenedlaethol Cymru i wneud darpariaeth ar gyfer llunio sgoriau hylendid bwyd ar gyfer sefydliadau busnes bwyd; arddangos gwybodaeth am sgoriau hylendid bwyd; gorfodi'r gofynion i arddangos gwybodaeth; ac at ddibenion cysylltiedig.}}
|-
| {{|Public Audit (Wales) Act 2013|cyshort=Deddf Archwilio Cyhoeddus (Cymru) 2013|anaw|3|29-04-2013|maintained=y|url=deddf-archwilio-cyhoeddus-cymru-public-audit-wales-act|An Act of the National Assembly for Wales to make provision reforming audit arrangements in Wales; continuing the office of Auditor General for Wales and creating a new body to be known as the Wales Audit Office; providing for the Auditor General for Wales to audit local government bodies in Wales; and for connected purposes.|cylong=Deddf gan Gynulliad Cenedlaethol Cymru i wneud darpariaeth i ddiwygio trefniadau archwilio yng Nghymru; i ragnodi y bydd swydd Archwilydd Cyffredinol Cymru yn parhau, ac i greu corff newydd o'r enw Swyddfa Archwilio Cymru; i ddarparu mai Archwilydd Cyffredinol Cymru fydd yn archwilio cyrff llywodraeth leol yng Nghymru; ac at ddibenion cysylltiedig.}}
|-
| {{|Local Government (Democracy) (Wales) Act 2013|cyshort=Deddf Llywodraeth Leol (Democratiaeth) (Cymru) 2013|anaw|4|30-07-2013|maintained=y|url=deddf-llywodraeth-leol-democratiaeth-cymru-local-government-democracy-wales-act|An Act of the National Assembly for Wales to make provision about the constitution and functions of the Local Democracy and Boundary Commission for Wales; to make various provisions relating to local government; and for connected purposes.|cylong=Deddf gan Gynulliad Cenedlaethol Cymru i wneud darpariaeth ynghylch cyfansoddiad a swyddogaethau Comisiwn Ffiniau a Democratiaeth Leol Cymru; i wneud darpariaethau amrywiol sy'n ymwneud â llywodraeth leol; ac at ddibenion cysylltiedig.}}
|-
| {{|Human Transplantation (Wales) Act 2013|cyshort=Deddf Trawsblannu Dynol (Cymru) 2013|anaw|5|10-09-2013|maintained=y|url=deddf-trawsblannu-dynol-cymru-human-transplantation-wales-act|An Act of the National Assembly for Wales to make provision concerning the consent required for the removal, storage and use of human organs and tissue for the purpose of transplantation; and for connected purposes.|cylong=Deddf gan Gynulliad Cenedlaethol Cymru i wneud darpariaeth ynglŷn â'r cydsyniad sy'n ofynnol ar gyfer tynnu, storio a defnyddio organau a meinweoedd dynol at ddiben trawsblannu; ac at ddibenion cysylltiedig.}}
|-
| {{|Mobile Homes (Wales) Act 2013|cyshort=Deddf Cartrefi Symudol (Cymru) 2013|anaw|6|04-11-2013|maintained=y|url=deddf-cartrefi-symudol-cymru-mobile-homes-wales-act|An Act of the National Assembly for Wales to reform and restate the law relating to mobile home sites in Wales.|cylong=Deddf gan Gynulliad Cenedlaethol Cymru i ddiwygio ac ailddatgan y gyfraith ynglŷn â safleoedd cartrefi symudol yng Nghymru.}}
|-
| {{|Active Travel (Wales) Act 2013|cyshort=Deddf Teithio Llesol (Cymru) 2013|anaw|7|04-11-2013|maintained=y|url=deddf-teithio-llesol-cymru-active-travel-wales-act|An Act of the National Assembly for Wales to make provision for the mapping of active travel routes and related facilities and for and in connection with integrated network maps; for securing that there are new and improved active travel routes and related facilities; for requiring the Welsh Ministers and local authorities to take reasonable steps to enhance the provision made for, and to have regard to the needs of, walkers and cyclists; for requiring functions under the Act to be exercised so as to promote active travel journeys and secure new and improved active travel routes and related facilities; and for connected purposes.|cylong=Deddf Cynulliad Cenedlaethol Cymru i wneud darpariaeth ar gyfer mapio llwybrau teithio llesol a chyfleusterau cysylltiedig ac ar gyfer mapiau rhwydwaith integredig ac mewn cysylltiad â'r mapiau hynny; ar gyfer sicrhau bod llwybrau teithio llesol a chyfleusterau cysylltiedig newydd a gwell; ar gyfer ei gwneud yn ofynnol i Weinidogion Cymru ac awdurdodau lleol gymryd camau rhesymol i wella'r ddarpariaeth ar gyfer cerddwyr a beicwyr, a rhoi sylw i'w hanghenion; ar gyfer ei gwneud yn ofynnol i swyddogaethau o dan y Ddeddf gael eu harfer er mwyn hyrwyddo teithiau teithio llesol a sicrhau llwybrau teithio llesol a chyfleusterau cysylltiedig newydd a gwell; ac at ddibenion cysylltiedig.}}
}}

References

2013